Barangay elections in the Philippines is scheduled to be held on October 30, 2023. The election shall elect the barangay captain, and seven members of the Sangguniang Barangay, or barangay council, in 42,022 barangays throughout the country. Barangays are the smallest local government unit in the Philippines.

Elections for the reformed Sangguniang Kabataan (SK; youth councils) will also be held at the same time. The youth shall elect among themselves an SK chairman, the eighth member of the Sangguniang Barangay, and eight SK kagawads, in each barangay.

Electoral system 

Each barangay has an elected chief executive, the barangay captain, and an 8-seat legislature, the Sangguniang Barangay, of which seven are elected at-large in this election.

Voters aged 18 to 30 years old also elect among themselves the Sangguniang Kabataan (SK) chairman in each barangay, who is the eighth member of the Sangguniang Barangay, and all 7 members of the SK at-large. Both barangay captain and SK chairman are elected via the first-past-the-post system, while the legislatures are elected via multiple non-transferable vote.

Barangay-level elections are nonpartisan elections. Slates of candidates for barangay captain and seven deputies, and an SK chairman and SK deputies, are common; a slate of barangay and SK candidates may cross-endorse each other. Political parties allegedly clandestinely support their candidates despite the nonpartisan nature of the election.  

Upon their election, barangay captains shall elect their cities' or municipalities' Liga ng mga Barangay president, also known as the Association of Barangay Captains or ABC president, who will also sit on their respective local municipal or city council. The municipal and city ABC presidents in a province shall elect among themselves a provincial ABC president that will also sit on the provincial board. The provincial and independent city ABC chairmen shall elect among themselves the national leadership of the League. The SK chairpersons shall do the same among their ranks. The SK national president shall become a member of the National Youth Commission.

Preparation

Postponement
The November 2016 barangay and SK elections were postponed to May 2018, then scheduled the following election to May 2020, then every three years thereafter.

On September 30, 2019, the Senate of the Philippines passed a bill postponing the date of the barangay and Sangguniang Kabataan elections to December 5, 2022. The House of Representatives followed suit on November 4, 2019. Both bills were consolidated into one bill on November 11, 2019. The bill was signed by then President Rodrigo Duterte on December 3, 2019.

In January 2022, a bill was filed by Joel Almario seeking to postpone this election to 2024. In May 2022, then presumptive vice president Sara Duterte agreed on postponing the barangay election to 2024 as a cost-saving measure. Outgoing Senate President Tito Sotto, meanwhile said in jest that if the barangay elections are to be postponed again, the barangay officials will have a longer term of office than the president. Negros Occidental governor Eugenio Jose Lacson said that if it will be postponed, it should be postponed for only a year.

At the opening of the 19th Congress in late July, Richard Gomez filed a bill postponing the election to 2023, so that the cost of the holding the election, around 8 billion pesos, will be used elsewhere. A Manila Times editorial questioned if the government will indeed save money, as the cost of the election would not be spent only on election day, and that the cost was already allocated in the national budget. Weeks later, the House Committee on Suffrage and Electoral Reforms approved the bill on second reading. COMELEC chairman George Erwin Garcia later said in Senate Committee on Electoral Reforms and People's Participation hearing that they will need an additional 18 billion pesos for them to hold the elections in December 2023, an increase from 5 billion pesos he earlier shared to the House committee, as it meant to cover increased honoraria for electoral board members. Postponing the elections will also lead to additional voter registration drives, which leads to more people being registered, which means more ballots have to be printed, more voting centers to be opened, and more election materials to be bought, thus increasing the cost. The House committee then voted on second reading a substitute bill postponing to December 2023.

Further House committee hearings had Garcia suggesting to postpone to election to allow more voters to be registered. Representative from Albay Edcel Lagman said that "to postpone an election to accommodate more voters is never a reason for postponing an election. To me, this is strange." A representative from the Department of Budget and Management agreed with Garcia's earlier statement in regards to having a bigger budget if the elections are postponed to 2023.

On September 20, the House of Representatives overwhelmingly passed the bill postponing the election to December 2023 on third reading.  Later that week, the Senate passed the bill on a 17–2 vote, with the dissenters solely coming from the minority bloc. On September 28, both chambers voted to ratify the bicameral conference committee version of the bill, largely based on the Senate version of the bill, that postpones the election to October 2023, and sets the term of office of barangay officials to three years.

On October 10, President Bongbong Marcos signed Republic Act No. 11935 which moved the date of barangay elections to the last Monday of October 2023.

League leadership 
The national president of the Liga ng mga Barangay, Faustino Dy V, resigned in 2019 to run for Congress. He was succeeded by Eden Pineda of Tacloban, and is expected to lead the league into the next elections.

Voter registration 
Because of these elections' postponement, barangay residents who did not or were unable to register between August 1 and September 30, 2019, have the opportunity to enroll their names in the registration period for the 2022 national elections. The period began on January 20, 2020, and would have ended on September 30, 2021. Registration was suspended in some areas in Cavite, Laguna and Batangas due to the Taal Volcano eruption, and in Makilala, Cotabato, due to an earthquake.

On March 10, 2020, the Commission on Elections (COMELEC) suspended voter registration in the entire Philippines due to the COVID-19 pandemic in the country. The commission later stated on August 15 that voter registration would resume on September 1 in areas under "general community quarantine" or "modified general community quarantine". Areas under "enhanced community quarantine" and "modified enhanced community quarantine" will have its registration suspended.

On the eve of the end of registration, chairman Sheriff Abas announced that the commission approved extending registration from October 11 to 30 for voters in the Philippines. On the same day, President Duterte signed into law a registration extension for 30 days from when it is made effective.

After the 2022 general election was held, the COMELEC began preparing for the barangay election, as a postponement law was yet to be passed. As set by the COMELEC, voter registration resumed from July 4 to 23.

With another postponement of the elections which was supposed to be held in December 2022, the voter registration was set from December 12 to January 31, 2023.

Statistics 
As of October 2022, there are 42,024 barangays. The new barangays that will be contested for the first time in 2022 are:

 Madilay-dilay in Tanay, Rizal, ratified after a successful plebiscite on July 28, 2018
 Lacnog West in Tabuk, Kalinga, ratified after a successful plebiscite on February 22, 2020
 New Canaan in Alabel, Sarangani, ratified after a successful plebiscite on August 20, 2022
 Barangays East, North, South, and West, in Ormoc, ratified after a successful plebiscite on October 8, 2022.
 Barangays District 1 to 28 reorganized to three barangays namely Barangay East, South, and West
 Barangay District 29 renamed as "Barangay North"
 Datu Dalidigan and Boganga II in Marawi, Lanao del Sur, ratified after a successful plebiscite on March 18, 2023.

This is a decrease from the 41,948 barangays disputed in May 2018, and an additional 96 disputed in Marawi later that year.

As there are one barangay chairman and seven regular barangay councilors, and the same number of SK chairmen and councilors in each barangay, there shall be 42,024 barangay captains and SK chairmen each, and 294,168 regular Sangguniang Barangay and SK councilors' positions each, that shall be disputed to date.

References

2023 elections in the Philippines
2022